"Surrender" is a #1 song recorded by Elvis Presley and published by Elvis Presley Music in 1961. It is an adaptation by Doc Pomus and Mort Shuman of the music of a 1902 Neapolitan ballad by Giambattista and Ernesto de Curtis entitled "Torna a Surriento" ("Come Back to Sorrento"). It hit number one in the US and UK in 1961 and eventually became one of his best-selling singles. Presley held the record for most consecutive number one singles on the Billboard Hot 100 before 1966 when The Beatles beat the record with six consecutive number ones released between 1965-1966. That record eventually was broken in 1988 by Whitney Houston, who continues to hold the record with seven. It would hold the record for most consecutive number ones by a solo artist until Houston broke that record with "So Emotional". This was one of 25 songs Doc Pomus and Mort Shuman wrote for Presley. It has been recorded by many other artists, including Michael Bublé, The Residents, and Il Volo.

Personnel
Elvis Presley - vocals
The Jordanaires - backing vocals
Millie Kirkham – backing vocals
Scotty Moore - electric guitar
Hank Garland - acoustic guitar
Bob Moore - double bass
D.J. Fontana - drums
Buddy Harman - percussion
Floyd Cramer - piano
Boots Randolph - saxophone

Charts

Covers
The Johnny Mann Singers - 1961
The Residents - 1990
Helmut Lotti - 1995
Michael Bublé - 2002
Anna Calvi - 2011 - the B side of 'Blackout' 7-inch single
Il Volo - 2012

See also
List of Hot 100 number-one singles of 1961 (U.S.)
List of number-one singles from the 1960s (UK)

References

External links
Songs by Doc Pomus

1961 singles
Elvis Presley songs
Billboard Hot 100 number-one singles
Cashbox number-one singles
UK Singles Chart number-one singles
Songs with music by Mort Shuman
Songs with lyrics by Doc Pomus
1961 songs